This is a list of women artists who were born in Cuba or whose artworks are closely associated with that country.

A
Yaquelin Abdala (born 1968), mixed media artist
Belkis Ayón (1967–1999), printmaker

B
María Brito (born 1947), Cuban-American painter, sculptor
Tania Bruguera (born 1968), installation artist

C
María Magdalena Campos Pons (born 1959), Cuban-American multidisciplinary artist
Maria Emilia Castagliola (born 1946), mixed-media artist
Sandra Amelia Ceballos Obaya (born 1961), painter
Mirta Cerra Herrera (1904–1986), painter
Liliam Cuenca (born 1944), painter, engraver

D
Demi (artist) (born 1955), Cuban-born American contemporary painter
Ana Albertina Delgado Álvarez (born 1963), painter, photographer, installation artist

F
Coco Fusco (born 1960), Cuban American interdisciplinary artist, writer, curator
Lourdes Gomez Franca (1933–2018), Cuban–American painter, poet

G
María Elena González (born 1957), installation artist

J
Martha Jiménez (active since 1971), sculptor, ceramist, painter

L
Rita Longa (1912–2000), sculptor
Glenda León (born 1976), multidisciplinary artist

M
María Martínez-Cañas (born 1960), photographer
Ruth González Mullen (1939–2009), painter

P
Gina Pellón (1926–2014), painter, based in France
Marta María Pérez Bravo (born 1959), painter, photographer
Amelia Peláez (1896–1968), painter

R
Lisandra Ramos (born 1987), multidisciplinary artist
Sandra Ramos (born 1969), contemporary artist
Lydia Rubio Ferrer (born 1946), contemporary artist

S
Zilia Sánchez Domínguez (born 1928), painter, sculptor, scenographer

T
Gladys Triana (born 1937), Cuban-American visual artist

V
Julia Emilia Valdés Borrero (born 1952), painter, engraver
Hilda Vidal Valdés (born 1941), multidisciplinary artist
Lesbia Vent Dumois (born 1932), visual artist

-
Cuban
Artists
Artists, women